Ryan Walters (born July 30, 1991) is an American professional ice hockey forward who is currently an unrestricted free agent. He most recently played for the Utah Grizzlies in the ECHL.

Early Years

Playing career
Walters played college hockey with the Nebraska–Omaha Mavericks in the NCAA Men's Division I WCHA conference. In his junior year, Walters was named to the 2012–13 All-WCHA First Team.

Upon completing his collegiate career, Walters signed an amateur try-out contract with the Bridgeport Sound Tigers of the American Hockey League on March 21, 2014.

Walters was invited to represent the Minnesota Wild at the 2014 NHL prospects tournament.  He signed a one-year contract with Minnesota's AHL affiliate, the Iowa Wild, on September 24, 2014.

On August 25, 2015, Walters signed a one-year contract as a free agent with the Utah Grizzlies of the ECHL.

After three full minor league seasons in North America, Walters opted to pursue a European career in agreeing to a one-year deal with Belarusian club, Yunost Minsk of the Extraliga on May 31, 2017. Walters played 10 games with Yunost before opting to return to the ECHL, with former club, the Utah Grizzlies on October 30, 2017.

Career statistics

Awards and honors

References

External links 

1991 births
Alaska Aces (ECHL) players
Bridgeport Sound Tigers players
Des Moines Buccaneers players
Iowa Wild players
Living people
Omaha Mavericks men's ice hockey players
People from Rosemount, Minnesota
Rapid City Rush players
San Diego Gulls (AHL) players
Utah Grizzlies (ECHL) players
Yunost Minsk players
American men's ice hockey forwards
AHCA Division I men's ice hockey All-Americans